Shelley Nelson is an English singer and songwriter from London, best known as the vocalist on the two top 20 hits by Tin Tin Out, "Here's Where the Story Ends" and "Sometimes", as well as the UK garage top 40 hit by Ed Case, "Something in Your Eyes". She has provided vocals on a large number of songs by different artists, including the 2001 duet with Chris de Burgh, "Two Sides to Every Story".

In 2018, Nelson recorded a new orchestral version of the K-Warren mix of "Something in Your Eyes" for the UK garage covers album Garage Classics with the House & Garage Orchestra. She also featured on another track on the album, a cover of the Doolally hit "Straight from the Heart".

Discography

Charted singles
"Top of the World" - with Dudearella (1996) - UK #83
"Treat Infamy" (Alternative 7" and 12" mixes) - with Rest Assured (1998) - UK #14
"Here's Where the Story Ends" - with Tin Tin Out (1998) - UK #7, UK Dance #5, SCO #10, U.S. Dance #15, ICE #21, NZ #45
"Sometimes" - with Tin Tin Out (1998) - UK #20
"Fall from Grace" (1999) - UK #90
"Something in Your Eyes" - with Ed Case (2000) - UK #38, UK Dance #2
"Two Sides to Every Story" - with Chris de Burgh (2001) - UK #172

References

External links

English women pop singers
English songwriters
Living people
UK garage singers
Singers from London
20th-century English women singers
20th-century English singers
21st-century English women singers
21st-century English singers
Year of birth missing (living people)